This is a listing of Australian rules footballers who made their senior debut for an Australian Football League (AFL) club during the 2004 AFL season.

Debuts

References

Australian rules football records and statistics
Australian rules football-related lists
2004 Australian Football League season